Justin Shaw (born September 23, 1982 in Victoria, British Columbia) is a former Canadian football linebacker for the Winnipeg Blue Bombers. He was drafted by the BC Lions in the third round of the 2008 CFL Draft. In college, he had previously played CIS Football for the Manitoba Bisons.

References

External links
BC Lions bio

1982 births
Living people
Sportspeople from Victoria, British Columbia
Canadian football linebackers
Manitoba Bisons football players
BC Lions players
Players of Canadian football from British Columbia